Richard van der Venne (born 16 May 1992) is a Dutch professional footballer who plays for Melbourne City in the  A-League Men.

Club career
He made his professional debut in the Eerste Divisie for FC Oss on 18 September 2015 in a game against FC Eindhoven.

Melbourne City 

On 22, June, 2022 Melbourne City FC announced they had signed van der Venne on a two-year contract. He made his A-league debut on 14, October, 2022 in a 2-0 win against Brisbane Roar, coming on as a substitute in the 55th minute.

On 12, November, 2022, van der Venne scored his first goal for Melbourne City FC in a 2-1 win against Newcastle Jets.

van der Venne scored a hat-trick for Melbourne City FC in a 6-1 victory against Macarthur FC on 4, February, 2023, scoring in the 33', 43', and the 77' minute making it his first Melbourne City FC and A-league hat-trick.

References

External links
 

1992 births
Sportspeople from Oss
Living people
Dutch footballers
TOP Oss players
Go Ahead Eagles players
RKC Waalwijk players
Melbourne City FC players
Eredivisie players
Eerste Divisie players
Association football midfielders
Footballers from North Brabant
Dutch expatriate footballers
Expatriate soccer players in Australia
Dutch expatriate sportspeople in Australia
21st-century Dutch people